Lieutenant-General Sir Maurice Somerville Chilton KBE CB (11 January 1898 – 21 August 1956) was Quartermaster-General to the Forces.

Military career

Educated at Rugby School, Chilton entered the Royal Military Academy, Woolwich and was commissioned into the Royal Artillery on 28 July 1915. He served in the First World War in France and attended the Staff College, Camberley in 1930. He also served in the Second World War latterly as Chief of Staff for the Second Army and then as Deputy Adjutant General for 21st Army Group.

After the war he became Director of Air at the War Office and then General Officer Commanding East Anglian District from 1948. He was made General Officer Commanding-in-Chief at Anti-Aircraft Command in 1953; in that capacity he visited his units on Merseyside and Tyneside. He became Quartermaster-General to the Forces in 1955 and died while still serving in that role in 1956.

Family
In 1926 he married Margaret Sinclair.

References

External links
Generals of World War II

 

|-
 

|-
 

1898 births
1956 deaths
People educated at Rugby School
Military personnel from Liverpool
Royal Artillery officers
Anti-Aircraft Command officers
Knights Commander of the Order of the British Empire
Companions of the Order of the Bath
British Army personnel of World War I
British Army generals of World War II
Place of birth missing
British Army lieutenant generals
Graduates of the Staff College, Camberley
Graduates of the Royal Military Academy, Woolwich